Calophaena is a genus of beetles in the family Carabidae, containing the following species:

 Calophaena aculeata Chaudoir, 1861 
 Calophaena acuminata (Olivier, 1790) 
 Calophaena alboguttata Waterhouse, 1880 
 Calophaena angusticollis Chaudoir, 1861 
 Calophaena apicalis Chaudoir, 1861 
 Calophaena apiceguttata Chaudoir, 1861 
 Calophaena arcuata (Guerin-Meneville, 1844) 
 Calophaena arrowi Liebke, 1930
 Calophaena azurea Liebke, 1938 
 Calophaena batesii Chaudoir, 1861 
 Calophaena bicincta (Dejean & Boisduval, 1829) 
 Calophaena bifasciata (Olivier, 1790) 
 Calophaena bonvouloirii Chaudoir, 1872 
 Calophaena buckleyi Liebke, 1930 
 Calophaena caeruleofasciata Liebke, 1930 
 Calophaena cincta (Gray, 1832) 
 Calophaena cordicollis Chaudoir, 1861 
 Calophaena costaricensis Liebke, 1930 
 Calophaena cruciata Bates, 1878 
 Calophaena dentatofasciata Chaudoir, 1861 
 Calophaena distincta Chaudoir, 1861 
 Calophaena dupuisi Liebke, 1930 
 Calophaena ephippigera Liebke, 1930 
 Calophaena gerstaeckeri Chaudoir, 1861 
 Calophaena gounellei Liebke, 1935 
 Calophaena grandispina Liebke, 1930 
 Calophaena hieroglyphica Liebke, 1930 
 Calophaena interrupta Liebke, 1938 
 Calophaena laevigata Bates, 1878 
 Calophaena lafertei Guerin-Meneville, 1844 
 Calophaena latecincta Chaudoir, 1861 
 Calophaena latefasciata Motschulsky, 1864 
 Calophaena maculata (Dejean, 1825) 
 Calophaena mimosa Reichardt, 1971 
 Calophaena moseri Liebke, 1930 
 Calophaena nevermanni Liebke, 1930  
 Calophaena nigripennis Chaudoir, 1852 
 Calophaena peruana Mateu, 1972 
 Calophaena pleurostigma Chaudoir, 1861 
 Calophaena quadrimaculata (Gory, 1830) 
 Calophaena rutilicollis Liebke, 1930 
 Calophaena schroederi Liebke, 1930 
 Calophaena sexmaculata Liebke, 1930 
 Calophaena unifasciata Chaudoir, 1861 
 Calophaena virgata Liebke, 1930 
 Calophaena viridipennis Bates, 1871 
 Calophaena vitticollis Bates, 1883 
 Calophaena xanthacra Chaudoir, 1861

References

Lebiinae